Bow Creek may refer to:

in England
Bow Creek (Devon), the estuary of the Harbourne River
Bow Creek (London), the estuary of the River Lea

in the United States
Bow Creek (Big Wapwallopen Creek), in Luzerne County, Pennsylvania
Bow Creek (Swatara Creek), in Dauphin County, Pennsylvania